Elizabeth is a single-member electoral district for the South Australian House of Assembly. It first existed from 1970 to 2006, when its boundaries were moved south and east and it was renamed to Little Para. The 2016 redistribution moved it further north and renamed it back to Elizabeth for the 2018 election. The district is in the northern suburbs of Adelaide, and named for the suburb of Elizabeth.

First incarnation (1970–2006)
The district of Elizabeth was first created in 1970 when the number of electorates increased from 39 to 47 and was abolished in 2006. Though Elizabeth was historically a safe Labor seat, it was held for a time by independent-turned-Labor MP Martyn Evans.

Elizabeth was renamed Little Para following boundary changes in the 2003 redistribution which took effect at the 2006 state election.

Current incarnation
The 2016 redistribution which took effect with the 2018 state election renamed Little Para back to Elizabeth, and moved the boundaries further north following the abolition of  Napier to create King. It consisted of the suburbs of Blakeview, Craigmore, Elizabeth, Elizabeth Downs, Elizabeth East, Elizabeth Grove, Elizabeth Park, Elizabeth South, Elizabeth Vale.

As a result of being over quota the 2020 redistribution has moved the southern boundary which was the Little Para River further north with Elizabeth Vale and parts of Elizabeth South which contained the former Elizabeth Holden Car Plant now moved to Ramsay. Hogarth Road has now become the Southern Boundary and the suburb of Blakeview remains the Northern Boundary.

Members for Elizabeth

Election results

See also
 1984 Elizabeth state by-election
 1994 Elizabeth state by-election

Notes

References
 ECSA profile for Elizabeth: 2018
 ABC profile for Elizabeth: 2018
 Poll Bludger profile for Elizabeth: 2018

External links
 1985 & 1989 election boundaries, page 18 & 19

Former electoral districts of South Australia
1970 establishments in Australia
2006 disestablishments in Australia